Vineyard Wind 1 is an  offshore wind farm under construction in U.S. federal waters in the Atlantic Ocean in Bureau of Ocean Energy Management-designated Lease Area OCS-A 0520, about 13 nautical miles - south of Martha’s Vineyard and Nantucket, Massachusetts. The array will include 62 wind turbines with a nameplate capacity of 804 MW, enough power for about 400,000 homes. The Massachusetts Department of Public Utilities approved the project in 2019. Construction began on November 18, 2021.

Project
The project is jointly owned by Copenhagen Infrastructure Partners and Iberdrola, through a subsidiary of Avangrid Renewables. GE Wind (offshore) (a subsidiary of GE Wind Energy based in Europe) will supply the turbines.  Windar Renovables will build the foundations; Prysmian Group will provide cabling.

The submarine power cable will run from about 15 miles south of the southeast corner of Martha's Vineyard to Covell's Beach in Centerville in Barnstable on Cape Cod about 34 miles (some 55 km) away, where via land it will connect to the electrical grid. through ISO New England.

The New Bedford Marine Commerce Terminal will act as a staging area for the project. DEME will handle some construction and installation logistics. The vessels used must comply with the Jones Act, so feeder barges will transport components from port to site. Salem Harbor is also being developed as an offshore wind port in conjunction with the project.

A final environmental impact statement (FEIS) was released in March 2021. Approval was delayed during the term of U.S. president Donald Trump, due to concerns regarding fishing and safety. The permission was fast-tracked after Joe Biden took office, and subsequently the Responsible Offshore Development Alliance started legal action. Final major federal approval was granted on May 11, 2021.

The developers have agreed to suspend construction during right whale activity in the area, and University of New Hampshire monitors marine mammal sounds. The project is expected to both reduce greenhouse gas emissions and reduce electricity costs for Massachusetts consumers. The farm secured 20 year contracts to sell the power it produces for $0.09 / kWh, and agreed to provide a total of $15 million for a fund to provide battery storage in low-income communities. A total of $2.3 billion in funding was secured in October 2021.

Overview

See also
Anbaric Development Partners
Cape Wind
East Coast of the United States
List of offshore wind farms
List of offshore wind farms in the United States
Mayflower Wind
Territorial waters
Vineyard Power Co-operative

References

External links 
 Vineyard Wind

Wind farms in Massachusetts
Proposed wind farms in the United States
Offshore wind farms in the United States